Michael Joseph Lynch (September 10, 1875 – April 1, 1947) was a center fielder for the Chicago Orphans baseball team in 1902.

In 1906, Lynch led the Northwestern League in batting average (.355), slugging percentage (.505), hits (130) and home runs (7) as a member of the Tacoma Tigers. Lynch began managing Tacoma in 1906 and held managerial role in the Northwestern League until 1914.

Lynch led the Spokane Indians to a Northwestern League pennant victory in 1909.

References

1875 births
1947 deaths
Major League Baseball center fielders
Chicago Orphans players
Minor league baseball managers
Anaconda Serpents players
Great Falls Indians players
Tacoma Tigers players
Minneapolis Millers (baseball) players
Seattle Turks players
Seattle Giants players
Spokane Indians managers
Spokane Indians players
Victoria Bees players
Baseball players from Minnesota